Onzlee Ware (born January 4, 1954) is an American politician and judge. A Democrat, he was elected to the Virginia House of Delegates in November 2003. He formerly represented the 11th District, which is made up of part of the City of Roanoke. He also served as the Minority Caucus Sergeant at Arms.

In November 2013, Ware announced his resignation from the House of Delegates, citing family issues. Ware is now the chief judge for Roanoke County Juvenile and Domestic Relations District Court, in the 23rd Judicial District of Virginia. Ware was sworn in on September 18, 2014.

Electoral history

Notes

References

External links

 
Follow the Money - Onzlee Ware
2007 2005 2003 campaign contributions

1954 births
Living people
Democratic Party members of the Virginia House of Delegates
Virginia state court judges
Virginia lawyers
Politicians from Roanoke, Virginia
Politicians from Greensboro, North Carolina
21st-century American politicians